Rumonge Nature Reserve is a protected area in Burundi covering . It was established in 1980.

References

Protected areas of Burundi
Protected areas established in 1980
1980 establishments in Burundi
Rumonge Province